A-Z of the Live Lounge is a competition ran by BBC Radio 1, between archive live lounge performances with the same first letter of their name (e.g. Adele, Arctic Monkey, etc.). It began in January 2011 and followed on from Live Lounge of 2010 (the first week back after Christmas for regular morning host Fearne Cotton), as the competition style was popular with the audience.

A

B

C

D

E

F

G

H

I

J

K

L

M

N

O

P

Q

R

S

T

U

V

W

X

Y/Z

0-9

References

Live Lounge